Madalyn Murray O'Hair (née Mays; April 13, 1919 – September 29, 1995) was an American activist supporting atheism and separation of church and state. In 1963 she founded American Atheists and served as its president until 1986, after which her son Jon Garth Murray succeeded her. She created the first issues of American Atheist Magazine and identified as a "militant feminist".

O'Hair is best known for the Murray v. Curlett lawsuit, which challenged the policy of mandatory prayers and Bible reading in Baltimore public schools, in which she named her first son William J. Murray as plaintiff. Consolidated with Abington School District v. Schempp (1963), it was heard by the United States Supreme Court, which ruled that officially sanctioned mandatory Bible-reading in American public schools was unconstitutional. The Supreme Court had prohibited officially sponsored prayer in schools in  Engel v. Vitale (1962) on similar grounds. After she founded the American Atheists and won Murray v. Curlett, she achieved attention to the extent that in 1964 Life magazine referred to her as "the most hated woman in America". Through American Atheists, O'Hair filed numerous other suits on issues of separation of church and state.

In 1995, O'Hair, her second son Jon Garth Murray (known as "Garth"), and her granddaughter and adopted daughter Robin Murray O'Hair (daughter of O'Hair's first son, William J. Murray, and Murray's high school girlfriend, Susan), disappeared from Austin, Texas. Garth Murray had withdrawn hundreds of thousands of dollars from American Atheists' funds, and there was speculation that the trio had absconded. David Roland Waters, a convicted felon and former employee of American Atheists, eventually admitted to murdering the O'Hairs. The bodies were not found until Waters led authorities to their burial place following a plea agreement whereby he would serve a prior sentence in Federal prison.

Early and personal life
Madalyn Mays was born in the Beechview neighborhood of Pittsburgh, Pennsylvania, on April 13, 1919, the daughter of Lena Christina (née Scholle) and John Irwin Mays. She had an older brother, John Irwin Jr. (known as "Irv"). Their father was of Scots-Irish ethnicity and their mother was of German ancestry. At the age of four, Madalyn was baptized into her father's Presbyterian church; her mother was a Lutheran. The family moved to Ohio, and in 1936, Mays graduated from Rossford High School in Rossford.

In 1941, Mays married John Henry Roths, a steelworker. They separated when they both enlisted for World War II service, he in the United States Marine Corps, and she in the Women's Army Corps. In April 1945, while posted to a cryptography position in Italy, she began a relationship with officer William J. Murray, Jr., a married Roman Catholic. He refused to divorce his wife. Mays divorced Roths and adopted the name Madalyn Murray. She gave birth to her son with officer Murray after returning to Ohio, and named the boy  William J. Murray III (nicknamed "Bill").

In 1949, Murray completed a bachelor's degree from Ashland University. She earned a  law degree from the South Texas College of Law, but did not pass the bar exam.

She moved with her son William to Baltimore, Maryland. On November 16, 1954, she gave birth to her second son, Jon Garth Murray, fathered by her boyfriend Michael Fiorillo.

According to her son William, a conservative activist, Madalyn was a socialist who showed sympathies towards the Soviet Union. William claimed that when he was still a child, Madalyn began hosting Socialist Labor Party meetings and asked him to attend so he could, as quoted from Madalyn, "learn the 'truth' about capitalism."  William also claimed that Madalyn twice sought to defect to the Soviet Union, applying first in 1959 through the Soviet Embassy in Washington, D.C., and again at the Soviet Embassy in Paris, traveling there for the express purpose in 1960; on both occasions, the Soviets denied her entry. On their return from Paris, Murray and sons went to live with her mother, father, and brother, Irv, at their house in the Loch Raven, Baltimore neighborhood. Soon after, Madalyn accompanied William to their neighborhood school, Woodbourne Junior High, to re-enroll William for freshman classes. Madalyn was unhappy to see students, after the recitation of the Pledge of Allegiance, engaging in prayer. She instructed William to keep a log of all religious exercises and references to religion for the next two weeks, saying, "Well, if they'll keep us from going to Russia where there is some freedom, we'll just have to change America." After the two weeks, and after her request that William be allowed to leave class during prayer times was denied by school authorities, she pulled him out of school and proceeded to file a lawsuit against the Baltimore Public School System, naming William as plaintiff. She said that its practices of mandatory prayer and required reading of the Bible were unconstitutional. The US Supreme Court upheld her position by a ruling in 1963. 

Because of hostility in Baltimore against her family related to this case, Murray left Maryland with her sons in 1963 and moved to Honolulu, Hawaii. She had allegedly assaulted five Baltimore City Police Department officers who tried to retrieve her son Willam's girlfriend Susan from her house; she was a minor and had run away from home. Susan gave birth to William's daughter, whom she named Robin. Murray later adopted Robin.

In 1965, Murray married U.S. Marine Richard O'Hair, and changed her surname. He had belonged to a Communist group in Detroit during the 1940s. During investigations of the 1950s, he gave more than 100 names of other members to the FBI. Later he was investigated for falsely claiming to be an FBI agent. Their relationship has been described as "textbook codependents". Although the couple separated, they were legally married until his death in 1978.

In 1980, she publicly rejected her estranged son William when he announced that he had converted to Christianity.

Activism and politics

In 1960, Murray filed a lawsuit against the Baltimore City Public School System (Murray v. Curlett), naming her son William as plaintiff. She challenged the city school system's practice of requiring students to participate in Bible readings at the city's public schools. She said her son's refusal to participate had resulted in bullying by classmates and that administrators condoned this behavior. After consolidation with Abington School District v. Schempp, the lawsuit was heard by the Supreme Court of the United States in 1963. The Court voted 8–1 in Schempp's favor, saying that mandatory public Bible readings by students were unconstitutional. Prayer in schools other than Bible-readings had been ruled as unconstitutional the year before by the Court in Engel v. Vitale (1962).

O'Hair filed a number of other lawsuits: one was against the National Aeronautics and Space Administration (NASA) because of the Apollo 8 Genesis reading. The case was rejected by the U.S. Supreme Court for lack of jurisdiction. The challenge had limited effect.

O'Hair endorsed Jimmy Carter in the 1976 presidential election because of Carter's opposition to mandatory school prayer, his support for sex education in public schools, and his stance on ecological matters.

Feminism 
During an interview with Playboy in 1965, O'Hair described herself as a "militant feminist" and expressed her dissatisfaction with women's inequality in America, stating during the interview:

She also expressed her discontent with the women's liberation movement.

Comments on the Holocaust 
In the article "The Shoah: hope springs eternal" in the August 1989 issue of the American Atheist magazine, O'Hair claimed:

In the same article, she claimed that "investigative and scholarly studies undertaken during the last fifty years", such as a book by Paul Rassinier, established that the total number of Jewish victims was between 1 and 1.5 million, adding, "[t]his is a far cry from an alleged 6,000,000", then elaborating on this point:

She concluded:

American Atheists

After settling in Austin, Texas, O'Hair founded American Atheists in 1963. It identifies as "a nationwide movement which defends the civil rights of non-believers, works for the separation of church and state and addresses issues of First Amendment public policy". She served as the group's first chief executive officer and president until 1986. She was the public voice and face of atheism in the United States during the 1960s and 1970s. Although her son Garth Murray succeeded her officially as president, she retained most of the power and decision making.

In a 1965 interview with Playboy Magazine, she described religion as "a crutch" and an "irrational reliance on superstitions and supernatural nonsense". In the same Playboy interview, O'Hair described numerous alleged incidents of harassment, intimidation, and death threats against her and her family. She read several letters she claimed to have received, including one that read (referring to the conversion of Paul the Apostle on the road to Damascus), "May Jesus, who you so vigorously deny, change you into a Paul." O'Hair told the interviewer, "Isn't that lovely? Christine Jorgensen had to go to Sweden for an operation, but me they'll fix with faith — painlessly and for nothing." She said that she left Baltimore because of persecution from residents. She had received mail containing photos smeared with feces, her son Jon's pet kitten was killed, and her home was stoned. She said she thought such events were a catalyst for her father's fatal heart attack.

She filed several lawsuits challenging governmental practices, based on upholding and defining the constitutional separation of church and state. Among these was one against the city of Baltimore's policy of classifying the Catholic Church as a tax-exempt organization in terms of property.

O'Hair founded an atheist radio program, in which she criticized religion and theism. She hosted a television show, American Atheist Forum, which was carried on more than 140 cable television systems.

Arrested for disorderly conduct in Austin in 1977, O'Hair continued to be a polarizing figure into the 1980s. She served as "chief speechwriter" for Larry Flynt's 1984 presidential campaign. She was regularly invited to appear on TV talk shows as a guest. Her second son Garth Murray officially succeeded her as president of the American Atheists, but she was said to retain most of the power. Some chapters seceded from the main group at the time. But , American Atheists continued as an active organization with a growing membership.

Her son William J. Murray became a Christian in 1980 and later a Baptist minister, publishing a memoir in 1982 about his spiritual journey. Murray O'Hair commented, "One could call this a postnatal abortion on the part of a mother, I guess; I repudiate him entirely and completely for now and all times ... he is beyond human forgiveness."

In 1988, O'Hair produced several issues of Truth Seeker under her masthead as part of an attempt to take over the publication,  but the courts ruled against her ownership.

In the 1990s, American Atheists staff consisted of O'Hair, her son Jon Garth Murray, Robin Murray O'Hair, and a handful of support personnel. William J. Murray was estranged from his mother, brother, and daughter. They had not met nor spoken for many years. The trio lived in O'Hair's large home, worked in the same office, and took shared vacations.

Court cases
O'Hair filed numerous lawsuits in which she argued the separation of church and state had been breached.
Murray v. Curlett (1963) Challenged Bible reading and prayer recitation in Maryland public schools.
Murray v. United States (1964) To force the Federal Communications Commission to extend the Fairness Doctrine so that atheists could have equal time with religion on radio and television.
Murray v. Nixon (1970) Challenged weekly religious services in the White House.
O'Hair v. Paine (1971) Challenged open readings from the Bible by U.S. astronauts (who are Federal employees) during their spaceflights, spurred by a reading from the book of Genesis by the crew of Apollo 8.
O'Hair v. Cooke (1977) Challenged the opening prayer at city council meetings in Austin, Texas.
O'Hair v. Blumenthal (1978) Challenged the inclusion of the phrase "In God We Trust" on U.S. currency.
O'Hair v. Hill (1978) To have removed from the Texas constitution a provision requiring a belief in God of persons holding offices of public trust.
O'Hair v. Andrus (1979) Challenged the use of National Park facilities for the Pope to hold a Roman Catholic mass on the Mall in Washington, D.C.
O'Hair v. Clements (1980) To have removed the nativity scene displayed in the rotunda of the capitol building in Austin, Texas.
Carter, et al. v Broadlawns Medical Center, et al. (1984-1987) Challenged the full-time employment of an unordained chaplain at a tax-funded county hospital, Broadlawns Medical Center in Des Moines, Iowa.

Kidnapping and murder
On August 27, 1995, O'Hair, her son Jon Garth Murray, and her granddaughter Robin Murray O'Hair disappeared from their home and office. A typewritten note was attached to the locked office door, saying "The Murray O'Hair family has been called out of town on an emergency basis. We do not know how long we will be gone at the time of the writing of this memo." When police entered O'Hair's home, it looked as if they had left suddenly. The trio said in phone calls that they were on "business" in San Antonio, Texas. Garth Murray ordered US$600,000 worth of gold coins from a San Antonio jeweler, but took delivery of only $400,000 worth of coins.

Until September 27, American Atheists employees received several phone calls from Robin and Jon, but neither explained why they had left or when they would return; employees reported that their voices sounded strained and disturbed. After September 28, no further communication came from any of the three. American Atheists was facing serious financial problems because of the withdrawal of funds, and membership dwindled in the face of an apparent scandal. There was speculation that the trio had disappeared in order to conceal its assets or avoid being contacted by creditors.

Investigation and arrests
Ultimately, the investigation focused on David Roland Waters, a felon with a violent history, who had worked for American Atheists. Earlier that year, he pled guilty to stealing $54,000 from the organization. Shortly after the theft of the money was discovered, O'Hair published an article in the American Atheists newsletter in which she exposed the theft of the money along with his previous crimes. O'Hair claimed that, at the age of 17, Waters had killed another teenager. Waters had been sentenced to eight years in prison.

Federal agents for the FBI and the IRS, along with the police, concluded that Waters and his accomplices had kidnapped all three Murray/O'Hair family members, forced them to withdraw the missing funds, went on several shopping sprees with their money and credit cards, and killed and dismembered all three people. Waters' accomplices were Gary Paul Karr and Danny Fry. A few days after O'Hair and her son and granddaughter were killed, Waters and Karr killed Fry. His body was found on a riverbed in rural Dallas County, but his head and hands were missing; as a result, it was not identified for three and a half years.

A search warrant was executed so the apartment of Waters and his girlfriend could be searched. The search revealed ammunition of various calibers. Waters, a convicted felon, was arrested, and the contents of his apartment were seized.  At the same time, Gary Karr was contacted in Walled Lake, Michigan, and interviewed. Having served the last 30 years in prison for kidnapping a judge's daughter, Karr would not talk. He had his rights read to him and he asked for permission to listen to the information which was being discussed. Karr decided to talk and implicated Waters in the deaths of Murray and the other two O'Hairs. Karr signed an affidavit and drew a map so that the police could find the bodies. Karr was arrested and taken to jail for possession of two firearms. He was held in Detroit, awaiting trial. The weapon charge was dismissed, and Karr was transferred to the custody of the United States Marshals in Austin because he needed to be tried for the deaths of the O'Hairs.

After a three-week trial, Karr was found guilty of conspiracy to commit extortion, traveling interstate in order to commit violent acts, money laundering, and interstate transportation of stolen property; all of the charges were related to the O'Hair case. He was acquitted of conspiring to kidnap the O'Hairs, because the authorities had not yet located their bodies. In August 2000, Karr was sentenced to two life terms in prison by U.S. District Judge Sam Sparks.

Waters was arrested and prosecuted; in a plea agreement on the charge of conspiracy, he agreed to lead authorities to the site where the dismembered bodies of the O'Hairs had been burned and buried. He was sentenced to serve 20 years in federal prison, which he had requested, because he did not want to serve time for his earlier theft conviction in Texas state prison. He did not go on trial for the kidnapping and murder of the three members of the O'Hair family. He was also ordered to pay back a total of $543,665 to American Atheists and the estates of Madalyn Murray O'Hair, Jon Garth Murray, and Robin Murray O'Hair. It is unlikely that these debts were ever paid, because Waters was not able to earn any money while he was in prison. Waters died of lung cancer on January 27, 2003 at the Federal Medical Center in Butner, North Carolina.

In January 2001, after he pled guilty to conspiracy, Waters told the federal agents that the O'Hairs were buried on a Texas ranch, and he subsequently led them to their bodies. When law enforcement officers excavated the site where the O'Hairs were buried, they discovered that the legs of all three of the victims had all been cut off with a saw. The remains had suffered such extensive mutilation and decomposition that officials had to identify them through dental records, DNA testing and, in Madalyn O'Hair's case, by matching the serial number on a prosthetic hip to records from Brackenridge Hospital in Austin. The head and hands of Danny Fry were also found at the site.

Waters and his girlfriend had put the gold coins which he and his accomplices had extorted from the O'Hairs in an unsecured storage locker which had been rented by his girlfriend. It only had a cheap Master padlock. Waters had taken some of the coins and for a few days, he partied with Gary Karr and his former wife. When he returned to the locker, he discovered that the remaining gold coins (American Gold Eagles, Maple Leaf coins, and Krugerrands) had all been stolen. A group of thieves from San Antonio who were operating in that area had gained keys to the type of lock which had been used by Waters' girlfriend. In the course of their activities, the thieves had come across the locker, used a key to open it, and found a suitcase which was full of gold coins. They returned to San Antonio, and with the help of friends, they exchanged the gold coins for cash. The friends were taken to Las Vegas for a weekend. All but one coin, which had been given as a pendant gift to an aunt, were spent by these thieves. That last coin was recovered by the FBI after a Memorial Day 1999 public appeal.

During the case, Austin reporter Robert Bryce criticized the relative lack of action by the Austin Police Department, even when contacted by estranged son William. He noted that the investigation was being led by agents of the Internal Revenue Service (with whom American Atheists had a long-running dispute over taxes owed), the Federal Bureau of Investigation (due to the possibility of the O'Hairs having absconded with organizational funds), and the Dallas County Sheriff's Office (where Fry's headless, limbless corpse was found).

Legacy 
Murray's 1960 lawsuit against the Baltimore City School System was later consolidated with a similar one from Pennsylvania, when these reached the US Supreme Court on appeal. The Court ruled in 1963 (in Abington School District v. Schempp) that school-sponsored Bible reading in public schools in the United States was unconstitutional. This decision gradually resulted in the end of religious activities sponsored by public schools. Non-religious students had been expected to participate in such activities, and state-level policies varied.

In 2012, a memorial brick for Murray, her son Jon, and her granddaughter Robin was placed at Lou Neff Point in Zilker Park in Austin, Texas.

In 2013, the first atheist monument to be erected on American government property was unveiled at the Bradford County Courthouse in Florida, where other residents had installed a monument to religious ideals (in this case, a replica of the Ten Commandments). It is a 1,500-pound granite bench and plinth inscribed with quotes by O'Hair, Thomas Jefferson, and Benjamin Franklin. The American Atheists said at the time that they planned to build 50 more monuments.

O'Hair was incorporated into a popular urban legend stemming from an erroneous characterization of RM-2493, a proposal made to the Federal Communications Commission (FCC) in 1974. The purpose of the proposal was to prevent organizations from making religious broadcasts on stations licensed for educational use. False rumors spread that O'Hair was a proponent of RM-2493, and that its intent was to ban the broadcast of religious services, and the reading of the Bible over the airwaves. The FCC's denial of RM-2493 in 1975, and O'Hair's later disappearance and murder, did little to stem the spread of the legend, which still claimed years later that O'Hair was pushing an active FCC proposal. Subsequent iterations of the rumor included allegations that O'Hair was campaigning to remove Christmas programs and songs from public schools and "office buildings". Other variations mentioned specific religious leaders who were supposedly being targeted for removal from the airwaves, or stated that the television series Touched by an Angel was threatened with cancellation because of the proposal. Evangelical Christian leader James Dobson became falsely associated with the legend as well, purportedly leading opposition to the FCC petition. As of 2015, the FCC was still receiving dozens of correspondences relating to O'Hair every month.

Popular culture
Episode 20 in season 7 of Forensic Files, titled "Without A Prayer", dealt with the disappearance of Madalyn Murray O'Hair, her son Jon Garth Murray and granddaughter Robin Murray-O'Hair. The episode originally aired on 14 December 2002.

A 2017 Netflix original movie, The Most Hated Woman in America, is a loose dramatization of O'Hair's life. It focuses on the abductions and killings of O'Hair and two family members in 1995.

An episode of Law & Order: Criminal Intent entitled "Eosphoros" is loosely based on O'Hair's murder. The episode originally aired on October 24, 2004.

Books about Murray O'Hair

See also
 Charles E. Stevens American Atheist Library and Archives
 List of kidnappings
 List of solved missing person cases

References

Further reading
  

  FBI. 

 
 LeDrew, Stephen. The evolution of atheism: The politics of a modern movement (Oxford University Press, 2015).
 Meagher, Richard J. Atheists in American politics: Social movement organizing from the nineteenth to the twenty-first centuries (Lexington Books, 2018).

  (memoir by her first son after he became a Christian)

 
 Sasse, Benjamin Eric. "The anti-Madalyn majority: Secular left, religious right, and the rise of Reagan's America" (PhD dissertation,  Yale University ProQuest Dissertations Publishing,  2004. 3125302) How political and religious enemies focused their attack on Madalyn Murray O'Hair. Sasse became a Republican Senator.

External links

 1968 debate between Baptist minister Walter Martin and O'Hair – MP3 file
 FBI Records: The Vault - Madalyn Murray O'Hair at fbi.gov
 Biography of O'Hair at Rotten.com
 
 Madalyn Murray O'Hair vs. Religious Broadcasting at urbanlegends.about.com
 Meeting Satan Herself: An evening with Madalyn Murray O'Hair: 14 September 1977
 The Murder of Madalyn Murray O'Hair: America's Most Hated Woman Crime Magazine

1919 births
1990s missing person cases
1995 deaths
1995 murders in the United States
20th-century American women writers
20th-century American non-fiction writers
20th-century atheists
20th-century essayists
American abortion-rights activists
American atheism activists
American Atheist Magazine editors
American atheist writers
American critics
American essayists
American feminist writers
American Holocaust deniers
American magazine publishers (people)
American people of German descent
American people of Scottish descent
American political writers
American social commentators
American socialist feminists
American socialists
American women critics
American women essayists
Ashland University alumni
Atheist feminists
Critics of creationism
Critics of religions
Deaths by strangulation in the United States
Female murder victims
Formerly missing people
Free speech activists
Kidnapped American people
Missing person cases in Texas
People murdered in Texas
South Texas College of Law alumni
Women founders
Women's Army Corps soldiers
Writers about religion and science
Writers from Austin, Texas
Writers from Baltimore
Writers from Pittsburgh
Writers from Toledo, Ohio